The 1944–45 Cypriot First Division was the 8th season of the Cypriot top-level football league.

Overview
It was contested by 6 teams, and EPA Larnaca FC won the championship.

League standings

Results

Championship play-off
 APOEL F.C. v EPA Larnaca FC 0-0
 EPA Larnaca FC v APOEL F.C. 3-1

References
Cyprus - List of final tables (RSSSF)

Cypriot First Division seasons
Cyp
1